Davallia (deersfoot fern, hare's foot fern,  shinobu fern, rabbit foot fern,  ball fern) is a genus of about 40 species of fern. In the Pteridophyte Phylogeny Group classification of 2016 (PPG I), it is the only genus in the family Davalliaceae, which is placed in the suborder Polypodiineae, order Polypodiales. Alternatively, the family may be placed in a very broadly defined family Polypodiaceae sensu lato as the subfamily Davallioideae.

The family is sister to the largest family of ferns, Polypodiaceae, and shares some morphological characters with it. Species are epiphytic ferns, with fronds arising from long aerial rhizomes which grow on and over thick bark on trees or on rock crevices.

Description 
Usually epiphytic or epipetric. Rhizomes dictyostelic, dorsiventral, densely scaly. Stipes articulate at base. Phyllopodia short. veins free. Sporangium stalk 3-rowed. Annulus vertical. Spores monolete.

Taxonomy
Gymnogrammitis and Leucostegia were once included in Davalliaceae, but these are now known to belong elsewhere. Gymnogrammitis is in a clade with Selliguea and others in the family Polypodiaceae. Leucostegia is in the family Hypodematiaceae, which consists of Hypodematium and Leucostegia, and possibly Didymochlaena as well.

In 2008, a molecular phylogenetic study of Davalliaceae showed that none of the polyspecific genera recognized at that time were monophyletic. In that same year, a revision of the family divided it into five genera. One of these, Araiostegiella, was newly described. The genus Davallia was divided into two sections, named Davallia and Trogostolon. Based on molecular phylogenetic studies, the Pteridophyte Phylogeny Group classification of 2016 (PPG I) accepts only one genus in the family, Davallia, sinking the other genera into synonymy. The study on which the PPG I circumscription is based divides the genus into seven sections.

Phylogeny
The following cladogram for the suborder Polypodiineae (eupolypods I), based on the consensus cladogram in the Pteridophyte Phylogeny Group classification of 2016 (PPG I), shows a likely phylogenetic relationship between Davalliaceae and the other families of the clade.

Selected species
Many of the species of Davallia are closely related and hard to distinguish from each other. In 1990, a treatment of Davalliaceae estimated the number of species at 110. A 2008 paper listed all of the species, recognizing only 63. A new species, Davallia napoensis was described in 2011. The Pteridophyte Phylogeny Group classification of 2016 (PPG I) suggests there are about 65 species.

 Davallia bullata - Japan, China, and tropical Asia. 
 Davallia canariensis - Macaronesia, Iberian Peninsula and Morocco.
 Davallia denticulata - Africa, India, China, Malesia, Indonesia, Polynesia, Australia
 Davallia divaricata (syn.: Davallia polyantha) - Tropical Asia.
 Davallia embolostegia
 Davallia fejeensis Hook (syn.: Davallia fijiensis) - Fiji Islands and Australia.
 Davallia mariesii or "Squirrel's-foot fern" – tropical Asia and Malaysia
 Davallia pectinata
 Davallia repens
 Davallia solida - Malaysia, Polynesia, and Queensland.
 Davallia solida var. pyxidata - New South Wales
 Davallia solida var. fejeensis (Hook.) Noot. - endemic to Fiji
 Davallia tasmanii - Davallia fern, native to the Three Kings Islands.
 Davallia trichomanoides (syn.: Davallia dissecta) - Malaysia.

Distribution and habitat
Davalliaceae is native to tropical and subtropical regions of the Pacific, Australia, Asia, and Africa. Plants are usually epiphytic, sometimes lithophytic or terrestrial.

Davallia as house plants 
Many species of Davallia are in cultivation, with Davallia tyermanii, Davallia fejeensis, and Davallia solida being perhaps the most well-known. A key to the cultivated species of Davallia is available. D. polypodiaceae, D. canariensis and D. trichomanoides are also grown as ornamental plants.  D. fejeensis is the most common Davallia species in commerce, and D. canariensis is widely grown as a house plant.

The plants have furry rhizomes which cover the surface of the potting mixture as well as root down into it. The fronds are triangular in shape and about 1½ feet long by 1 foot wide.  They divide into three to four pinnae which subdivide into many pinnules.  Davallia are often used in hanging baskets because the rhizomes split into sections and the surface is covered quickly.  Unlike other ferns, Davallia tolerate low levels of humidity.

References

Lorenzi, H. & Souza, M. S. (2001). Plantas Ornamentais no Brasil: arbustivas, herbáceas e trepadeiras. Plantarum  
Key, K. & Baines, J. (1974). El ABC de las Plantas de Interior. Blume  
Hay, R., McQuown G., & Beckett, K. (1976). Diccionario ilustrado en color de plantas de interior. Gustavo Gili   
Hellyer, A. (1976). The Collingridge Encyclopedia of Gardening. Hamlyn 
Bornhorst, Heidi. Davallia fern has many names, various uses. Honolulu Advertiser, November 11, 2001.  (accessed October 8, 2015)

External links

Davalliaceae
Epiphytes
Fern genera
Taxa named by Carl Linnaeus